Sergei Vyacheslavovich Grunichev (born 9 March 1963 in Stavropol) is a former Russian football player.

References

1963 births
Sportspeople from Stavropol
Living people
Soviet footballers
FC Dynamo Stavropol players
FC Spartak Moscow players
Russian footballers
Russian Premier League players
Association football midfielders
Association football forwards